The 1970–71 NBA season was the Warriors' 25th season in the NBA and ninth in the San Francisco Bay Area.

It was also the franchise's final season in San Francisco before relocating across the Bay to Oakland the following season. The team would not play in San Francisco full time until the 2019–20 NBA season.

Offseason

Draft picks

Roster

Regular season

Season standings

z – clinched division title
y – clinched division title
x – clinched playoff spot

Record vs. opponents

Game log

Playoffs

|- align="center" bgcolor="#ffcccc"
| 1
| March 27
| Milwaukee
| L 96–107
| Jeff Mullins (30)
| Nate Thurmond (15)
| Jeff Mullins (7)
| Oakland–Alameda County Coliseum Arena11,216
| 0–1
|- align="center" bgcolor="#ffcccc"
| 2
| March 29
| @ Milwaukee
| L 90–104
| Nate Thurmond (18)
| Clyde Lee (13)
| Mullins, Williams (4)
| University of Wisconsin Field House12,868
| 0–2
|- align="center" bgcolor="#ffcccc"
| 3
| March 30
| @ Milwaukee
| L 102–114
| Jerry Lucas (25)
| Jerry Lucas (20)
| Ron Williams (8)
| University of Wisconsin Field House12,868
| 0–3
|- align="center" bgcolor="#ccffcc"
| 4
| April 1
| Milwaukee
| W 106–104
| Jerry Lucas (32)
| Jeff Mullins (19)
| Ron Williams (9)
| Oakland–Alameda County Coliseum Arena7,615
| 1–3
|- align="center" bgcolor="#ffcccc"
| 5
| April 4
| @ Milwaukee
| L 86–136
| Ron Williams (13)
| Clyde Lee (11)
| Mullins, Williams (4)
| University of Wisconsin Field House12,868
| 1–4
|-

Awards and records
 Jerry Lucas, NBA All-Star Game
 Nate Thurmond, NBA All-Defensive First Team

References

San Francisco
Golden State Warriors seasons
San Fran
San Fran